1828 in archaeology

Events
 The 'Metternich Stela' is presented by Muhammad Ali of Egypt to Prince Metternich.

Finds
 The Crondall Hoard, a hoard of one hundred and one old French and Anglo-Saxon coins, is found in the village of Crondall in the English county of Hampshire.

Publications
 Prussian Academy of Sciences begins publication of the Corpus Inscriptionum Graecum under the editorship of August Böckh.

Births 
 May 2 - Désiré Charnay, French archaeologist and explorer (d. 1915)
 August 18 - Jakob Messikommer, Swiss archaeologist (d. 1917)
 Frank Calvert, British archaeologist (d. 1908)

Deaths
 March 31 - Charles "Hindoo" Stuart, Anglo-Irish British East India Company officer and collector of Hindu antiquities (b. c.1758)

See also
  List of years in archaeology
 1827 in archaeology
 1829 in archaeology

References

Archaeology
Archaeology by year
Archaeology
Archaeology